The Faculty of Philosophy and History is one of twelve faculties at the University of Heidelberg. The present Faculty of Philosophy is the result of the amalgamation in 2002 of sectors of the former Faculties of History and Philosophy and of Oriental and Classical Studies. It is made up of three groups of subjects with common cultural, historical and geographical roots. It comprises 23 institutes and departments.

Department of Philosophy

Centre for European Historical and Cultural Studies (ZEGK)

Department of History
History was taught at Heidelberg for the first time by professor ordinarius historiarum Janus Gruterus († 1627). The first chair was established in 1807.

Institute of the History of Franconia and the Palatinate (FPI)

Institute of Religious Studies

Institute of European Art History (IEK)

Department of Musicology

Department of Eastern European History

Centre for East Asian Studies (ZO)

Institute of Japanese Studies

Institute of East Asian Art History

Institute of Chinese Studies
The Institute for Chinese Studies as part of the Faculty of Philosophy at the University of Heidelberg was established in 1962.

Department of Classical Studies
The Department of Classical Studies was founded in 1807 by Georg Friedrich Creuzer

Centre for Ancient Studies

Altertumswissenschaftliches Kolleg

Department of Egyptology

Department of Ancient History and Epigraphics
The Department of Ancient History was established at the University of Heidelberg in 1887.

Department of Byzantine Archaeology and Art History

Department of Classical Archaeology

Department of Papyrology

Department of Prehistory and Protohistory and Middle Eastern Archaeology

Department of Languages and Cultures of the Near East

Assyrian Studies

Iranian Studies

Islamic Studies

Semitic Studies

South Asia Institute (SAI)
The Sudasien Institut (South Asia Institute in English) of the Heidelberg University was founded in 1962.

Chair of the Curt Engelhorn Foundation and Schurman Library for American History

Notes and references

Heidelberg University